Tokyo Friend Park 2 (often abbreviated as "TFP2") is a Japanese game show that premiered in April 1994 on the Tokyo Broadcasting Station (TBS).  TFP2 airs on Monday nights roughly from 6:55 - 7:54 JST in Japan.

Format
A preset number of contestants (typically four) compete for prizes that range from foot baths, massage chairs and big screen televisions to new vehicles (typically a Land Rover).  As with most Japanese game shows, the contestants are usually already celebrities in Japan such as singers, comedians, models (idols), actors, etc.

The contestants are organized in one team and compete in several games throughout the show. For each mini game they clear, the team is awarded a gold coin that can be used to win prizes at the end. Any team that successfully clears all of the games wins the Grand Slam Prize, usually a trip to Disneyland.

Games
The mini game format is very similar to that of The Price Is Right. Each show features a few mini games that are selected on a seemingly rotational basis from a library of games.  However, there are a few games that occur each week. In every show, the team is awarded coins based on how well they do in each mini game and if they clear all of the games, the team will earn a "Grand Slam" and a trip to Disneyland in Paris or Anaheim for one week. At the end, teams will be given a set of darts (one dart for each coin they've won) that they can throw at a spinning dart board to try to win prizes. The spinning board is cut into a pie fashion similar to the Showcase Showdown wheel on The Price Is Right.

Mini games have preset benchmarks that teams must meet in order to win coins. Teams that do exceptionally well (for example, teams that may clinch an early mini-game win) can be awarded extra coins in order to exchange for extra darts at the end of the show for more tries at the prizes if they accomplish certain feats in the mini-games (exceptionally high scores, etc.).  For example, in Wall Crash, a coin may be awarded when the team reaches 140 points. If this happens early in the game, the host may offer extra coins if the team can earn another 140 points with their remaining tries.

Wall Crash
This is a game in which contestants will dress in a velcro suit and run towards a mini-trampoline, which will launch them towards a velcro wall.  The objective of the contestant is to jump as high as they can to gain the highest position on the wall as possible.  The higher the contestant can reach on the wall, the more points they will garner for their team; there are point scoring zones on each side of the wall, and a contestant scores points for the highest zone they get each hand in; however, if a hand is completely in the center "NG zone," no points are awarded for that hand.  A coin is awarded to the team if they accumulate a preset number of points (the formula is 50 points per player, minus 15 for each woman on the team), with a minimum of 200 points for a team of men, or 140 for a team of women); each player is permitted one attempt, however, a team is given at least 4 attempts, so that if a team of 3 contestants plays the game, one jumps twice, and if a team of 2 contestants plays, each contestant jumps twice. The top corners of the wall have two large red rectangles marked "CLEAR!"; and if a player gets either hand to stick at least partly within the rectangle, they automatically win the coin. Famous Japanese pop group Morning Musume competed in 2000.

Go! Uphill
Each player is dressed in an animal costume, and is given four colored markers. The player takes those markers one at a time, and runs up a hill with a sharp upward curve, trying to place the markers as high as possible; the hill is marked with numbers from 0 to 50. Each player has 20 seconds to place their markers (usually, due to the tight time limit, only three markers actually get placed). If the marker straddles a line, the higher point value is credited, and if a preset goal is reached (90 points for each man and 75 points for each woman on the team), the team wins a coin. In addition, near the top of the hill is a large red circle marked "CLEAR!"; a player who gets a marker in this circle will automatically win their team a coin.

Quiz! Body and Brain
This game takes two players.  The first runs on a treadmill and the other is asked a number of trivia questions.  The host will ask a question that will require the trivia expert to list a few answers (for example, ”Name five of the seven dwarfs.").  When the timer starts, the runner will start running on a treadmill. Once the runner reaches a certain speed, the other contestant can start listing possible answers as long as the runner can maintain that speed.  The team has a total of 15 seconds to answer each question; there is no penalty for wrong answers. (In some cases, more than one player will run at once; the speeds are added together as they run, and the runners must achieve a required combined speed.) If the team can successfully complete the quota of questions (usually either 5 out of 9, or 5 or 6 out of 10), they win a coin.

Physical Mail
A question appears on a screen, and two players type in the answer on a giant keyboard of katakana characters. Three other buttons in the start area allow the players to remove incorrect characters, change the characters to kanji (with each press, the computer cycles through the possible conversions), and submit the answer. The team has either 3 minutes to give 9 correct answers, or 4 minutes to give 12 correct answers.

Wild Wild Duck
In this game, two players compete. Both players stand on a platform; one player runs in place on this platform, stepping on two actuators to make the platform move forward to the first of two islands. The players then take turns kicking acorn-shaped soccer balls at three targets. When all of the targets are completely knocked over, two golf clubs pop out of the island. The players then ride another platform to the second island in the same way as the first, where they take turns driving golf balls at a target; when a golf ball hits the target, the course is complete. The team has a total of 60 seconds to complete the course to earn a coin. The time is represented by a motorized duck moving along the course (hence the name) popping balloons when there are 30, 15, and 10 seconds left; if the duck reaches the finish line and pops the final red balloon, the team has failed. The team is allowed two attempts at this game.

Fool on the Hill
The first participant listens to a section of the melody of a song on the headphones, and then must match the melody using music pads by hitting on the right "note" pads at the right time. If the player hits the right note pad at the right time, the note will sound; if not, nothing will be played. The second player is then asked to identify the song based on the notes that the first player managed to hit at the right time. The second player gets four chances to identify each song. If the second player fails on an attempt, the first player tries to play the song again before the second player's next attempt. If the second player identifies a song on the first try, the team earns 40 points. The second try is worth 30 points, the third try is worth 20 points, and the fourth try is worth 10 points. To win a coin, the team needs to earn 80 points across four songs.

Boon Boon Bowling
One player is given a ball attached to the ceiling with a rope, so that it swings back to the player when thrown. The player tries to hit targets with the ball; seven will knock over oversized bowling pins (hence the name), three more (smaller and bowling pin-shaped) are set up on a rotating turntable. The player has 60 seconds to hit all 10 targets to win a coin, and the team has a total of three attempts.

Flash Saurus
This is also a two-player game.  One player pumps air into a vertical tube using what resembles a bicycle tire pump, while the other player stands on an approximately one-meter ledge.  When the object inside the tube reaches the top, a series of track lights will come towards the player standing on the ledge. That player must then jump off the ledge and land on the ground below precisely when the track lights reach the platform.  The faster the first player can pump air to get the object to the top of the vertical tube, the slower the lights will travel, allowing a better chance the second player will trap the track lights below. The timer counts up to a maximum of 30 seconds, with the light's speed increasing after 8, 13, 18, and 23 seconds.  The team has eight attempts, and three successful trials wins them a coin. If a team of more than two players is competing, then each player (other than the player operating the pump) has their own platform, and all players must trap their lights to be successful. In such an event, the team's goal may be reduced.

Never Wipe Out
In this game, two players stand on a long platform that sways from side to side like a teeter-totter.  In front of them is an attached giant platformed board that moves with the teeter-totter.  A ball is dropped from the top and the players must use the teeter-totter and gravity to navigate the ball all the way to a basket at the bottom of the maze. To make the challenge more difficult, a motorized platform moves the basket back and forth at the bottom. If the ball falls off the edges, that attempt ends in failure. The team has six tries to get a ball into the basket at the bottom, and a single successful attempt will award the team a coin.

Delisoba Gold
The team plays a video game in which the object is to drive a moped to the end of a course. Two of the participants sit on the moped at a time; one is the driver, the other holds a stack of packages. The bottom package has an electronic device that will throw the packages off the stack if the driver crashes; the team must re-stack the packages before continuing. The team has a total of four minutes to complete the course; either two pairs of participants play for 120 seconds each, or three pairs play for 80 seconds each. If the team completes the course, they win a coin. The game went through variations named "Delisoba Grand Prix" and "Delisoba Deluxe" in earlier years, and the course and obstacles varied with each new version.

Arcade Game
This game consists of five to eight mini-games similar to those found at a typical carnival or amusement park. For each mini-game, the team has 30 seconds to complete its respective goal; to win the coin, the team must complete 3 out of 5, 4 out of 6, or 5 out of 7 or 8. Clearing all of the mini-games presented (or in the case of eight mini-games, completing seven) awards the team a second coin. If a team is going for a second coin, one of the remaining games is usually made more difficult. The mini-games include:
Banana Shooter: This mini-game uses two players; one player sets up giant bananas for the other to kick at a soccer goal; a rotating monkey acts as the goalie. The team must score five goals to win the mini-game.
Blowgun Fighter: One player must use pre-loaded blowguns to pop eight balloons on a board a short distance away.
Bingo Tornado: One player throws balls at a wall with nine panels. The player must hit the panels so that they rotate to display a gold coin pictured on the other side. The player wins the mini-game by successfully revealing a line of three coins.
Floating Balloon: One player must throw inflatable beach balls so that they float in the upward air current by each of three blowers.
Flower Ball: One player rolls balls skee-ball-style at a target shaped like a flower. The player must get seven balls into the target to win the mini-game.
Flying Burger: One player on the team places oversized hamburgers on a catapult, while another player, armed with a mallet, uses the catapult to throw the hamburgers into take-out containers on a rotating table a short distance away. In the center of the table is a giant milkshake; landing a hamburger in the milkshake counts the same as landing it in a container. A team wins the mini-game by landing hamburgers into three containers (or two containers and the milkshake). The remaining members of the team are allowed to stand behind the table and act as a backboard, but cannot use their hands.
Pizza Catcher: One player throws frisbees decorated to look like pizzas at holes in a wall (one circular, one triangular, one square). The player must throw a pizza through each of the three holes.
Shooting Star: One player rolls discs with the assistance of a specially-designed chute down a fan-shaped table in an attempt to knock over 12 cylindrical blocks. 
Shuriken Attack: One player slides discs shaped like shurikens (throwing stars) down a table which sharply tapers in an attempt to knock over five cylindrical blocks. It is possible to win after time expires if the disc is launched before that happens (a gate labeled "TIME OVER" is lowered and blocks any further attempts when the clock hits zero).
Super Dunk 1-on-1: One player shoots basketballs at a hoop, and must make seven baskets. In addition, after 10 seconds have elapsed, the basket begins to rotate, making the task more difficult.
Takoyaki Bong Bong: Six oversized takoyaki rotate around randomly inside a table. Using the stick provided, the player must skewer each takoyaki through the hole in its side and deposit it in the basket. The player may not touch the tip of the skewer.
Throw Forward: The player must throw American footballs at a target consisting of a net with three round holes in an effort to get a ball through each of the three holes.
Tire Bomber: The player must hit the sides of a tire-shaped launcher to propel a ball to knock over three targets labeled with a "T," an "F," and a "P."

Chu Chu Busters
Each member of the team wears a pair of boxing gloves for this game. One member of the team is placed in an arena containing mouse-shaped targets that pop in and out of their holes, similar to Whac-A-Mole. The player must hit the targets to earn points. At certain points, signaled by a jet of fog, a special target pops out, and the player must hit the target multiple times for a larger point bonus. At pre-stated intervals (usually every 30 seconds), the player in the arena is replaced by a teammate. Towards the end of the game, two players are allowed to be in the arena at once, and at a special signal, two large targets move across the front of the arena; each player in the arena takes one of the targets, and scores a large point bonus for hitting that target a total of 50 times. The team wins a coin by achieving a pre-stated score within the time limit, usually between 2 and 5 minutes, with larger teams usually given more time, and a correspondingly larger goal score.

Stopper Cubridge
One team member plays a game similar to Stacker. The player views a line of blocks moving around the screen, and must hit a large pad with a club to stop the blocks. The player must complete a bridge from the left side of the screen to the right side of the screen. It takes a total of 10 successful stops to complete the bridge; as in Stacker, any blocks that do not line up with the previous set are removed, and if at any point the player fails to line up any of the blocks, that attempt ends in failure. The team is allowed three attempts to complete their bridge, and one successful attempt wins a coin.

Hyper Hockey
This is usually the last competitive game in the show. Two members of the team play air hockey against the comedy duo Honjamaka. As the comedy duo plays air hockey every week, they are given a handicap of a ridiculous costume that hinders their ability to play. The game is played to 7 points, and if the contestant team wins they gain an extra coin and a "Grand Slam" for clearing all of the other games.

Darts
At the end of each show, participants can choose between taking the coins (worth ¥100,000 each) or trading their coins in for darts; most contestants trade their coins for a dart each.  Participants will then throw their darts at a large spinning dart-board.

The dart board is divided like a pie graph; a center circle is gray, while the outside is divided into many colored sections. A very small section stands for a new car for each participant while the other sections size are equally and each represent a prize that was chosen by each participants. If the dart hits the board, the board will stop and the contestant will win the prize shown.

If the participant misses the board or if the dart bounces off, the contestant will win nothing.  Prizes range from a high variety of electronics to a Land Rover. If the contestant's dart lands in the gray center circle, or in one of the gray sections around the outside, the contestant will win a tawashi (a sponge, the show's joke prize). If the thrown dart misses the board and lands somewhere else (like the background or the floor), the participant's name will be written on the place it landed.

Guests

References

1994 Japanese television series debuts
2011 Japanese television series endings
Japanese game shows
TBS Television (Japan) original programming